The William H. Pitt Health and Recreation Center is a 2,062-seat multipurpose arena in Fairfield, Connecticut on the campus of Sacred Heart University. It was opened in August 1997 and is home to Sacred Heart University men's and women's basketball, men's and women's volleyball, men's wrestling and fencing. It hosted the finals of the 2008 Northeast Conference men's basketball tournament.

Constructing the facility cost $13.8 million.  The William H. Pitt Health and Recreation Center has three levels and houses four basketball courts, a fitness center, an aerobics and fencing room, and a sports medicine and rehabilitation center.  Outdoors near the Pitt Center, there is an artificial turf athletic field with an eight-lane outdoor running track, six artificial surface tennis courts, and several grass fields and trails around campus.

In 2007, the Pitt Center underwent major renovations.  On the lower level, a wrestling room, a weight room, more locker room space, and new floors were added.  The Pitt Center also was re-painted.

See also
 List of NCAA Division I basketball arenas

References

External links
 

Sports venues completed in 1997
Sacred Heart Pioneers men's basketball
College basketball venues in the United States
College volleyball venues in the United States
Sports venues in Connecticut
Indoor arenas in Connecticut
Basketball venues in Connecticut
Sports venues in Fairfield County, Connecticut
Buildings and structures in Fairfield, Connecticut
1997 establishments in Connecticut